Rennesøy is a former municipality in Rogaland county, Norway. It was merged into Stavanger municipality on 1 January 2020. It was located in the traditional district of Ryfylke. The administrative centre of the municipality is the village of Vikevåg. Other villages in Rennesøy included Askje and Sørbø. The municipality encompassed a number of islands on the south side of the Boknafjorden, north of the city of Stavanger.

At the time of its dissolution, the  municipality was the 404th largest by area out of the 422 municipalities in Norway. Rennesøy was the 207th most populous municipality in Norway with a population of 4,892.

General information

The parish of Rennesø was established as a municipality on 1 January 1838 (see formannskapsdistrikt law). On 1 July 1884, the municipality was split in two with the islands of Mosterøy, Klosterøy, Fjøløy, Kvitsøy, and the western part of Åmøy forming the new municipality of Mosterøy, and the islands of Rennesøy and Brimse remained as Rennesøy municipality. This split left Rennesøy with 1,092 residents, less than half of its previous population. The island of Kvitsøy later became an independent municipality of its own.

On 1 July 1918, the Hanasand area of the neighboring municipality of Finnøy (population: 72) that was located on the island of Rennesøy was transferred to Rennesøy municipality.

During the 1960s, there were many municipal mergers across Norway due to the work of the Schei Committee. On 1 January 1965, the municipality of Mosterøy was merged back into Rennesøy. Prior to the merger, Rennesøy had 1,370 residents.

On 1 January 2020, the municipalities of Finnøy, Rennesøy, and Stavanger were merge into one, large municipality called Stavanger.

Name
The municipality was named after the main island of the municipality, Rennesøy. The Old Norse form of the name was Rennisøy. The meaning of the first element is unknown and the last element is øy which means "island". Before 1918, the name was written "Rennesø".

Coat of arms
The coat of arms was granted on 20 February 1981. The arms show two silver/white crosiers on a blue background. The blue represents the ocean, an important feature for this island municipality. The crosiers represent the importance of Norway's oldest and best preserved monasteries, Utstein Abbey, located in the municipality.

Churches
The Church of Norway had two parishes within the municipality of Rennesøy. It was part of the Tungenes prosti (deanery) in the Diocese of Stavanger.

Geography
The island municipality sat on the south side of the large Boknafjorden. It consists of about 80 islands, most of which are uninhabited. The main islands are Rennesøy, Mosterøy, Klosterøy, Fjøløy, Sokn, Bru, Brimse, and the western part of Åmøy (the eastern part is part of Stavanger municipality). All of the main islands are connected together and to the mainland by a series of bridges and tunnels (except for Brimse which has a ferry connection). The Fjøløy Lighthouse is located in the northwestern part of the municipality, lighting a main shipping channel to Stavanger.

Government
All municipalities in Norway, including Rennesøy, are responsible for primary education (through 10th grade), outpatient health services, senior citizen services, unemployment and other social services, zoning, economic development, and municipal roads. The municipality is governed by a municipal council of elected representatives, which in turn elect a mayor.  The municipality fell under the Stavanger District Court and the Gulating Court of Appeal.

Municipal council
The municipal council of Rennesøy was made up of 21 representatives that were elected to four year terms. The party breakdown of the final municipal council was as follows:

Transportation

Since 1992, Rennesøy municipality has been connected to the mainland by a series of bridges and undersea tunnels. The Byfjord Tunnel connects the mainland to the island of Sokn, and it is part of the European route E39 highway. The island of Sokn is connected to the three islands of Åmøy, Bru, and Mosterøy by bridges. Mosterøy is connected to Fjøløy and Klosterøy by short bridges and to Rennesøy by the undersea Mastrafjord Tunnel. Rennesøy island is also connected to the island of Vestre Bokn (across the Boknafjorden) by ferry. Furthermore, the island of Rennesøy is connected to the two islands of Finnøy and Talgje in the neighboring municipality of Finnøy to the northeast by the Finnøy Tunnel.

References

External links

Municipal fact sheet from Statistics Norway 

 
Former municipalities of Norway
1838 establishments in Norway
2020 disestablishments in Norway